Center Township is one of six townships in Union County, Indiana, United States. As of the 2010 census, its population was 3,048 and it contained 1,330 housing units.

Geography

Cities and towns
 Liberty (the county seat)

Unincorporated towns
 Cottage Grove at 
 Goodwins Corner at 
 Lotus at 
 Salem at 
(This list is based on USGS data and may include former settlements.)

Cemeteries
The township contains these five cemeteries: Calvary, Drook, Pentecost, Sering and West Point.

Airports and landing strips
 E-Z Acres Airport

Landmarks
 Whitewater Memorial State Park (east edge)

School districts
 Union County-College Corner Joint School District

Political districts
 Indiana's 6th congressional district
 State House District 55
 State Senate District 43

References
 United States Census Bureau 2007 TIGER/Line Shapefiles
 United States Board on Geographic Names (GNIS)
 IndianaMap

External links
 Indiana Township Association
 United Township Association of Indiana

Townships in Union County, Indiana
Townships in Indiana